Flindersia brayleyana, commonly known as Queensland maple, maple silkwood or red beech, is a species of tree in the family Rutaceae and is endemic to northern Queensland. It has pinnate leaves with between six and ten leaflets, panicles of white or cream-coloured flowers and smooth fruit that opens in five sections to release winged seeds.

Description
The leaves have many conspicuous oil dots.

Taxonomy
Flindersia brayleyana was first formally described in 1866 by Ferdinand von Mueller in Fragmenta phytographiae Australiae from specimens collected near the Herbert River by John Dallachy. The specific epithet (brayleyana) honours Edward William Brayley.

Distribution and habitat

Conservation status
Flindersia brayleyana is classified as of "least concern" under the Queensland Government Nature Conservation Act 1992.

Uses
Queensland maple produces a good quality, decorative cabinet timber and has been used in the manufacture of propellers and plywood in Mosquito bomber aircraft and in acoustic guitars. However most specimens are protected in World Heritage areas, the timber is now in very short supply, and attempts to grow the tree in plantations have failed. Its heartwood is pink to brownish pink whilst the narrow sapwood band is white to pale grey.

References

External links

Flindersia brayleyana: Occurrence data from Australasian Virtual Herbarium

brayleyana
Flora of Queensland
Sapindales of Australia
Trees of Australia
Taxa named by Ferdinand von Mueller
Plants described in 1866